Anna-Stina Lorentze Nilstoft (1928–2017) was a Swedish painter.

She was born on 15 June 1928, in Kalmar, Sweden. Between 1952 and 1954, she studied at Skånska Målarskolan, the school of fine arts in Malmö, Sweden and continued study from 1955 to 1958 at Marie Wadskjær's School of Painting in Copenhagen, Denmark. She died on 17 July 2017 in Höganäs, Sweden.

References 

1928 births
2017 deaths
Swedish women painters
20th-century Swedish women artists
20th-century Swedish women
20th-century Swedish painters